The gaohu (高胡; pinyin: gāohú, ; Cantonese: gou1 wu4; also called yuehu 粤胡) is a Chinese bowed string instrument developed from the erhu in the 1920s by the musician and composer Lü Wencheng (1898–1981) and used in Cantonese music and Cantonese opera. It belongs to the huqin family of instruments, together with the zhonghu, erhu, banhu, jinghu, and sihu; its name means "high-pitched huqin". It is the leading instrument of Cantonese music and opera ensembles. Well known pieces for the gaohu include Bu Bu Gao (步步高, Higher Step By Step) and Ping Hu Qiu Yue (平湖秋月, Autumn Moon on Calm Lake).

Construction and design
The gaohu is similar in construction to the erhu but has a slightly smaller soundbox, commonly circular, and is tuned a fourth higher, to G4 and D5. Whereas most huqin are placed on top of the left thigh, the traditional gaohu is played with the soundbox held in between the knees. It has a brighter and lighter tone as compared to the erhu. It has two strings and its soundbox is covered on the front (playing) end with snakeskin (from a python). Since the soundbox is so small, the overall sound of the "gaohu" is quiet

Although originally a regional instrument used only in Cantonese music, the gaohu (in different forms and played placed on the leg, as the erhu) is used in the modern large Chinese orchestra, as part of the string family, along with the erhu, zhonghu, banhu, cello, and double bass.

Notable players
Notable gaohu players include:
Lü Wencheng (吕文成, pinyin: Lǚ Wénchéng) (1898–1981)  in Chinese
Liu Tianyi (1910–1990)  in Chinese
Gan Shangshi (1931– )
Yu Qiwei (1953– ) in English  in Chinese

See also
 
Cantonese music (disambiguation)
Cantonese opera
Huqin
Music of China
Traditional Chinese musical instruments
String instruments

References
 Huehns, Colin. "China's fiddle." Strad, Vol. 110, Issue 1312 (Aug 1999)
 Zhao, Y. et al.  "Sound Intensity Radiated by Gaohu." Science China, Vol. 53, No. 7 (2010)
 Huang, Rijin (1997) Guangdong Yinyue; Gaohu Qu Xuan (Guangdong Music; Selected Pieces for Gaohu). Beijing: Renmin Yinyue Chubanshe (Peoples Music Publishing House)

Bowed instruments
Chinese musical instruments
Drumhead lutes
Huqin family instruments
Cantonese music